Elijah ben Moses Ashkenazi Loans also known as Elijah Baal Shem of Worms (1555 – July 1636) was a German rabbi and Kabbalist.

He was born in Frankfurt-am-Main. He belonged to the family of Rashi, on his mother's side was the grandson of Johanan Luria, and on his father's of Josel of Rosheim. 

After studying in his native city under the direction of Jacob Ginzburg and Akiba Frankfort, Loans went to Cracow, where he attended the lectures of Rabbi Menahem Mendel Avigdors. He also studied in the Yeshivah of the Maharal. While there he prepared for publication the "Darke Mosheh" of Moses Isserles. At the beginning of the seventeenth century Loans was called to the rabbinate of Fulda, which he left in 1612, occupying successively the rabbinates of Hanau, Friedberg (1620), and Worms (1630), in which last-named city he remained until his death.

Loans was a diligent student of Kabbalah, and for this reason was surnamed "Ba'al Shem." He was also accomplished in music and calligraphy, and various legends circulated regarding his personality. He was the author of the following works: Rinnat Dodim (Basel, 1600), a commentary on Song of Songs; Miklol Yofi (Amsterdam, 1695), a commentary on Ecclesiastes; Wikkuaḥ Yayin 'im ha-Mayim (Amsterdam, 1757), a poem with a commentary; Ma'agle Ẓedeḳ (Neubauer, "Catalogue of the Hebrew MSS. in the Bodleian Library" No. 1832), a commentary on Baḥya's "Ḥobot ha-Lebabot"; Ẓofnat Pa'aneaḥ (Neubauer, "Catalogue of the Hebrew MSS. in the Bodleian Library" No. 1830), a commentary on the "Tiḳḳune Zohar"; a commentary on Genesis Rabbah (Neubauer, "Catalogue of the Hebrew MSS. in the Bodleian Library" No. 149); and Adderet Eliyahu (Neubauer, "Catalogue of the Hebrew MSS. in the Bodleian Library" No. 1829), a commentary on the Zohar.

Loans also edited the "'Ammude Shelomoh" of Solomon Luria on the "Semag" (Basel, 1599), and the "Sha'are Dura" of Isaac ben Meïr of Dueren, to which he wrote a preface (Neubauer, "Catalogue of the Hebrew MSS. in the Bodleian Library" No. 1600).

References 

1555 births
1636 deaths
17th-century German rabbis
16th-century German rabbis
Baal Shem
Kabbalists
Rabbis from Frankfurt